Orofaciodigital syndrome or oral-facial-digital syndrome is a group of at least 13 related conditions that affect the development of the mouth, facial features, and digits in between 1 in 50,000 to 250,000 newborns with the majority of cases being type I (Papillon-League-Psaume syndrome).


Type 
The different types are:s
 Type I, Papillon-League-Psaume syndrome
 Type II, Mohr syndrome
 Type III, Sugarman syndrome
 Type IV, Baraitser-Burn syndrome
 Type V, Thurston syndrome
 Type VI, Varadi-Papp syndrome
 Type VII, Whelan syndrome
 Type VIII, Oral-facial-digital syndrome, Edwards type (not to be confused with Edwards syndrome)
 Type IX, OFD syndrome with retinal abnormalities
 Type X, OFD with fibular aplasia
 Type XI, Gabrielli syndrome

References

External links 

Rare syndromes
Syndromes affecting teeth